Penmans is a Toronto, Canada-based clothing manufacturer. It was founded as a woolen knitting mill in Paris, Ontario, in 1868. It became one of Canada's largest suppliers of cotton and woolen knit goods, including hosiery and underwear, by the 1890s. 

Once known for long johns (which it no longer makes), Penmans now produces sports shirts, sweatpants, sweatshirts, and shorts. Penmans-branded clothing was once sold by Walmart.

References

External links
1906 underwear advertisement
Penmans 1927 Display
Penmans 1931 fashion exhibit

Clothing manufacturers
Manufacturing companies based in Toronto
Companies established in 1868
Canadian brands